ColoringBook is a three-part series of recordings by composer Clayton Counts.  Incorporating elements of drone, minimalism, and found sound, the records feature an array of instrumentalists, with a heavy focus on stringed and keyed instruments.

The project is regarded as a work of noise music, though some of it is structurally similar to jazz, contemporary classical, or electroacoustic music.  It is known for its use of synthesis, layering, and spatialization.

These recordings were later re-released by Bull of Heaven (which Counts was also a part of) under their name and the title 221: The Usual Manifestations of Suspicion Were Heightened in 2011.

External links
claytoncountsdotcom, Clayton Counts' website
ColoringBook, ColoringBook's MySpace page

Noise music albums by American artists